Arnold's leaf-toed gecko (Hemidactylus arnoldi) is a species of lizard in the family Gekkonidae. The species is endemic to Somalia.

Etymology
The specific name, arnoldi, is in honor of British herpetologist Edwin Nicholas "Nick" Arnold.

Geographic range
H. arnoldi is found in northwestern Somalia.

Habitat

Description
H. arnoldi is large for its genus, and it is stout.

Reproduction
H. arnoldi is oviparous.

References

Further reading
Lanza B (1978). "On some new or interesting east African amphibians and reptiles". Monitore Zoologico Italiano, Supplemento 10 (14): 229–297. (Hemidactylus arnoldi, new species, p. 243–249, Figures 10–12). (in English, with an abstract in Italian).
Lanza B (1990). "Amphibians and reptiles of the Somali Democratic Republic: check list and biogeography". Biogeographia 14: 407–465. (Hemidactylus arnoldi, pp. 414, 445).
Rösler H (2000). "Kommentierte Liste der rezent, subrezent und fossil bekannten Geckotaxa (Reptilia: Gekkonomorpha)". Gekkota 2: 28–153. (Hemidactylus arnoldi, p. 85). (in German).

Hemidactylus
Geckos of Africa
Reptiles of Somalia
Endemic fauna of Somalia
Reptiles described in 1978
Taxa named by Benedetto Lanza